St. Dominic High School is a private, Roman Catholic high school in Oyster Bay, New York.  It is located within the Roman Catholic Diocese of Rockville Centre.

Background
St. Dominic High School was established on September 10, 1928, by Rev. Charles J. Canivan, following the establishment of St. Dominic Elementary School September 8, 1924.

Campus 
The campus consists of four  buildings: Canivan and Marian Hall, the New Science building, and a gymnasium complete with three basketball courts. Classrooms are located in Canivan and Marian Hall, while the cafeteria and auditorium are located in Canivan Hall. Outdoor athletic fields with an estimated value of US$23,000,000 were donated by Charles Wang and consist of baseball, softball, lacrosse, and soccer fields, plus tennis courts nearby in Muttontown. The school also shares the street with St. Dominic's Church and a smaller chapel.

Athletics 
St. Dominic High School offers the following teams:

BOYS: Basketball, Bowling, Football, Baseball, Tennis, Soccer, Cross Country, Winter and Spring Track, Golf, Lacrosse

GIRLS: Basketball, Softball, Bowling, Soccer, Swimming, Tennis, Lacrosse, Volleyball, Cross Country, Winter and Spring Track, Cheerleading.

 Boys New York State Federation High School Basketball Championships: 1980 (Class C), 1997 (Class B)
 Boys New York State CHSAA Championships: 1996
 Girls New York State Federation High School Basketball Championships: 1989, 1996 (Class B), 2003 (Class D)
 Girls New York State CHSAA Championships: 1994, 1996, 1998, 2003

Notable alumni
Reiss Knehr, (born 1996), professional baseball pitcher for the San Diego Padres of Major League Baseball (MLB). 
Lt. Joseph Mawad, Texas A&M Football (hero of Newburgh) 
Tim Kempton (born 1964), former (NBA) Basketball player.
 Jim Moran (born 1978), professional basketball player
 Todd Hodne (1959–2020), former Penn State Nittany Lions football linebacker and convicted rapist, robber and murderer.
 Rick Pitino (born 1952), Naismith Memorial Basketball Hall of Fame inductee as a coach
 Ralph Willard (born 1946), coached St. Dominic High School Basketball, 1973 to 1985.
 Mike Morgan (born 1978), 2018 & 2019 National Championship head coach at Merrimack College (Lacrosse)
 Jason Hernandez (born 1978), Assistant Coach - NBA Charlotte Hornets

References

External links
 School website

Catholic secondary schools in New York (state)
Educational institutions established in 1928
Roman Catholic Diocese of Rockville Centre
Schools in Nassau County, New York
1928 establishments in New York (state)